Drug-induced autoimmune hemolytic anemia is a form of hemolytic anemia.

In some cases, a drug can cause the immune system to mistakenly think the body's own red blood cells are dangerous, foreign substances. Antibodies then develop against the red blood cells. The antibodies attach to red blood cells and cause them to break down too early. It is known that more than 150 drugs can cause this type of hemolytic anemia. The list includes :
 Cephalosporins (a class of antibiotics)
 Dapsone
 Levodopa
 Levofloxacin
 Methyldopa
 Nitrofurantoin
 Nonsteroidal anti-inflammatory drugs (NSAIDs) - among them, the commonly used Diclofenac and Ibuprofen
 Phenazopyridine (pyridium)
 Quinidine

Penicillin in high doses can induce immune mediated hemolysis via the hapten mechanism in which antibodies are targeted against the combination of penicillin in association with red blood cells. Complement is activated by the attached antibody leading to the removal of red blood cells by the spleen.

The drug itself can be targeted by the immune system, e.g. by IgE in a Type I hypersensitivity reaction to penicillin, rarely leading to anaphylaxis.

See also
 List of circulatory system conditions
 List of hematologic conditions

References

External links 

Acquired hemolytic anemia
Drug-induced diseases